Scarecrow Messiah is the sixth album by the band Bride, and is the follow-up to their commercial successful album Snakes in the Playground. The album received a Dove Award for "Hard Music Album of The Year" at the 25th GMA Dove Awards in 1994. This is also the last album to feature bassist Rik Foley.

Track listing
 "Beast" – 4:27
 "Place" – 3:41
 "Murder" – 4:07
 "Scarecrow" – 3:51
 "Crazy" – 3:44
 "Time" – 4:16
 "One" – 3:28
 "Doubt" – 4:11
 "Dad Mom" – 3:29
 "Thorns" – 5:51
 "Questions" – 1:51

Personnel
Dale Thompson – vocals
Troy Thompson – guitar
Jerry McBroom – drums
Rik Foley – bass

References

1994 albums
Bride (band) albums